The South Central League was a minor league baseball league that played in the 1906 and 1912 seasons, with franchises located in Arkansas, Oklahoma and Texas. The McAlester Miners (1906) and Longview Cannibals (1912) won league championships.

History

The 1906 league consisted of teams from Arkansas and Oklahoma. The six–team league included the Fort Smith Razorbacks, the Guthrie Senators, the Muskogee Indians, the Shawnee Blues, the South McAlester Miners and the Tulsa Oilers. Guthrie and Shawnee disbanded on July 21, while the whole league disbanded in August. The Miners finished in first place. One notable player, Clyde Milan, spent time in the league.

Cities represented 
 Cleburne, TX: Cleburne Railroaders 1912 
 Fort Smith, AR: Fort Smith Razorbacks 1906 
 Guthrie, OK: Guthrie Senators 1906 
 Longview, TX: Longview Cannibals 1912 
 Marshall, TX: Marshall Athletics 1912
 Muskogee, OK: Muskogee Indians 1906
 Paris, TX: Paris Boosters 1912 
 Shawnee, OK: Shawnee Blues 1906
 Texarkana, TX: Texarkana Twins 1912 
 McAlester, OK: McAlester Miners 1906 
 Tulsa, OK: Tulsa Oilers 1906
 Tyler, TX: Tyler Elbertas 1912

League standings and statistics 
1906 South Central League
schedule
 Guthrie and Shawnee started the second half July 4, but disbanded July 21. The league disbanded August 5.

1912 South Central League
schedule
 Tyler and Cleburne disbanded July 17. Playoff: Texarkana was declared champion as first half winner Cleburne disbanded.

References

External links
Baseball Reference

Defunct minor baseball leagues in the United States
Baseball leagues in Oklahoma
Baseball leagues in Arkansas
Baseball leagues in Texas
Sports leagues established in 1906
Sports leagues disestablished in 1912